The Beijing Olympic Village is a complex of high-rise apartments in Beijing, China, which were opened to the public on July 27, 2008 and closed on August 27, 2008, in conjunction with the 2008 Summer Olympics. As an Olympic Village, it hosted the competitors and their coaches during the event. 

It is also connected to two media villages which can host up to 7,000 media personnel. The village was designed to accommodate over 16,000 athletes while providing ample space for both the athletes' social and athletic needs. Of the $42 billion Beijing spent on hosting the 2008 Summer Olympics, $1.827 billion went to the Olympic Village. 

Safety was of extreme importance to athletes as well as their home countries. During the Olympics, extreme humidity and pollution were a problem, with the Czech team taking their own air measurements to ensure the health and safety of their athletes.

After the Olympics, apartments on the Olympic Green have been transformed into a residential area. Due to this, for the 2022 Winter Olympics, there was a need to build another Olympic Village on a smaller scale. These new buildings are located in the southern area of Olympic Green at area of the former hockey and archery fields on the neighbour area of the National Olympic Sports Center.

See also
Olympic Green
Venues of the 2008 Summer Olympics
Venues of the 2022 Winter Olympics

References

Further reading
 Vetvicka, J., & Handl, M. (2011). Beijing 2008 olympic games meant danger for the health of athletes? Monitoring of air pollution during games of XXIX olympiade by PM10. British Journal of Sports Medicine, 45(4), 381-381.
 Olympic Village Briefing Press Conference. (2008). Chinese Law & Government, 41(6), 83–92.4
 Owen, J. (2005). Estimating the Cost and Benefit of Hosting Olympic Games: What Can 	Beijing Expect from Its 2008 Games? The Industrial Geographer, 3(1), 1-18.

Venues of the 2008 Summer Olympics
Buildings and structures in Chaoyang District, Beijing
Olympic Villages
Olympic Village